Great Synagogue was the largest synagogue in the city of Katowice (Kattowitz), in southwestern Poland. It was erected in 1900 in what was then the German Empire, and was designed by Max Grünfeld. The synagogue was set on fire by the Nazis in early September 1939 during the invasion of Poland.

History 
The plans to raise a new synagogue in Katowice arose around 1890, when the Old Synagogue (Katowice) became too small for the local worshippers. The construction begun in 1896, and the architect in charge was Max Grünfeld, son of Ignatz Grünfeld who designed the old synagogue. The construction was finished in 1900 and the synagogue was opened on 12 October 1900.

The synagogue was set on fire by Nazis in early days of September 1939 after they gained control of the city during the invasion of Poland (1939); probably on 8 September. 
After the war the few Jews who survived the Holocaust were unable to gather enough resources and support to rebuild the synagogue. Today in the place where this building once stood is a square (Synagogue Square). In the 1988 a monument was raised in the square, dedicated to the Jewish inhabitants of the city who perished during the Second World War.

Design 
The brick synagogue was designed on the basis of a modified rectangle in style mixing Neo-Gothic with Neo-Renaissance, eclecticism and traces of Mauritian style; similar to the style of reformed Judaism synagogues in contemporary Germany.

The synagogue had a large dome with a cross-ribbed vault over the main prayer chamber which was preceded by a large entrance hall with offices and the chamber of marriage. The main chamber was topped with a lantern. Other characteristics elements included large decorated windows and small towers.

The main chamber could hold 1120 people; 670 males and 450 females.

References

Synagogues completed in 1900
Buildings and structures in Katowice
Gothic Revival synagogues
Synagogues in Poland destroyed by Nazi Germany
Gothic Revival architecture in Poland
Renaissance Revival synagogues
Synagogue buildings with domes
20th-century religious buildings and structures in Poland